Over may refer to:

Places
Over, Cambridgeshire, England
Over, Cheshire, England
Over, South Gloucestershire, England
Over, Tewkesbury, near Gloucester, England
Over Bridge
Over, Seevetal, Germany

Music

Albums
Over (album), by Peter Hammill, 1977
Over (EP), by Jarboe and Telecognac, 2000

Songs
"Over" (Blake Shelton song)
"Over" (Drake song)
"Over" (Evans Blue song)
"Over" (Fayray song)
"OVER" (Hey! Say! JUMP song)
"Over" (High and Mighty Color song)
"Over" (Lindsay Lohan song)
"Over" (Portishead song)
"Over", by A Perfect Circle from 
"Over", by Ashanti from Ashanti
"Over", by Embrace from If You've Never Been
"Over", by Ivy from Realistic
"Over", by James Blunt from The Afterlove
"Over", by Jimmy Eat World from Stay on My Side Tonight
"Over", by Kings of Leon from Walls
"Over", by Lucky Daye
"Over", by Lykke Li on Eyeye
"Over", by Playboy Carti on Whole Lotta Red
"Over", by Tove Lo on Truth Serum
"Over", by Yuma Uchida
"Over", by Zarif from Box of Secrets
"Over", a commonly used unofficial title for a studio outtake by Cardiacs included on Toy World

Other uses
Over, a term in radio radiotelephony procedure
Over, a professional wrestling term
OVER, a clause that window functions in SQL have
Over (cricket), a division of play in the sport of cricket
Over (Bobobo-bo Bo-bobo), a fictional character in the anime/manga Bobobo-bo Bo-bobo
"Over" (Breaking Bad), an episode from season two of Breaking Bad

See also

Over church (disambiguation)
"Over and Over", a song by Wilson Phillips, on the B-side from the single "Hold On"